Badminton Denmark is the national governing body for the sport of badminton in Denmark. The organization represents 649 clubs as of 2018. The highest authority in Badminton Denmark is the assembly where each member club is represented. The board of directors' duty is to ensure the organisation moves in the direction that the assembly decided. There is an administration that runs the organisation day-to-day. The organization maintains the rules of badminton for Denmark, usually in line with those of the Badminton World Federation.

Badminton Denmark operates two elite centers where elite players can go to train under the supervision of such greats as Morten Frost and Thomas Stuer-Lauridsen. There is also a center for the development of youth players run by Lotte Olsen.

In addition to overseeing the national club competitions and running the national championship tournaments (including youth and senior championships), Badminton Denmark organises international tournaments.

History
Badminton Denmark was established on 15 January 1930 as Denmark's Badminton Union by representatives from Skovshoved, Copenhagen BK, Neyes BK, Helsingør BK, Stubbekøbing IF and Roskilde BK. In order to avoid confusion with Danish Football Association which also uses the initial DBU, the name was later changed to Danish Badminton Federation.

Tournaments
 Denmark Open, an annual open tournament that attracts the world's elite players.
 Copenhagen Masters, an annual invitational tournament played between Christmas and New Year

References

National members of the Badminton World Federation
Badminton in Denmark
Badminton
1930 establishments in Denmark